The Hungarian breeds of domestic animals are often seen as national symbols in Hungary.

Mammals

Livestock
 Long-horn Hungarian Grey Cattle- traditionally kept in the open all year.
 Racka - a breed of sheep with distinctive horns.
 Mangalica - a breed of pigs, characterised by their long curly hair and relatively fatty meat which makes them ideal for making sausages and salami.
 Cikta sheep
 Nóniusz horse

Dogs
 Magyar Vizsla - one of the oldest hunting dogs of the world. The ancestors of this dog came into the Carpathian Basin with the nomadic Hungarian tribes.
 Hungarian Puli - small shepherd dog
 Hungarian Komondor - a very large livestock guardian and shepherd dog, was brought to Hungary a thousand years ago by nomadic Magyars.
 Hungarian Kuvasz - large shepherd dog.
 Hungarian Pumi - small shepherd dog.
 Hungarian Sighthound - already known in the 8th century, it is as old as the Vizsla. 
 Transylvanian Bloodhound - a hunting dog.
 Hungarian Mudi - small shepherd dog.
 Sinka

See also
List of mammals of Hungary
National symbols of Hungary

References